Dacus is a genus of tephritid  or fruit flies in the family Tephritidae.

Systematics
Many subgenera are defined within this genus:

Ambitidacus
Callantra
Dacus
Didacus
Leptoxyda
Lophodacus
Mellesis
Neodacus
Psilodacus

See also
List of Dacus species

References

External links

Dacinae
Tephritidae genera